Brøndbyernes Idrætsforening (usually abbreviated to Brøndby IF, is a professional association football club based in Brøndbyvester, Capital Region of Denmark. The club was founded in 1964 as a merger between two local clubs and was promoted to the Danish top-flight football league in 1981.

Brøndby IF has won 11 Danish championships and 7 Danish Cups. Brøndby's most successful period was from 1985 to 2005 when, in twenty years, they won ten league titles. In 1991, Brøndby reached the semi-finals of the UEFA Cup and became the first and only Danish club to ever reach a European semi-final.

Since the founding of F.C. Copenhagen in 1992, they have had a fierce rivalry. Matches between the two clubs are referred to as the Copenhagen Derby.

History

Formation (1964–1977)
Brøndbyernes Idrætsforening was formed on 3 December 1964 following a merger between two local rivals – Brøndbyøster IF and Brøndbyvester IF. The merger was to be completed as a prerequisite for the construction of a new stadium by Brøndby Municipality. Brøndby IF spent its inaugural season as an amateur club in the 6th tier of the 11 Danish leagues, the Serie 1, where they finished their two first seasons in fourth place. Among the players of the early years was team captain Per Bjerregaard, a doctor who had moved to Copenhagen from Randers in Jutland, and Hans Gregersen, who was the mascot of the team until his death by syphilis in 1967. In 1967, the club hired coach Leif Andersen who instantly secured promotion to Sjællandsserien (the Zealand series). After a few mediocre years, a new coach, John Sinding, was brought in, and the club won promotion to Danmarksserien (the Denmark series).

In 1973, Per Bjerregaard stopped his active career at 27 years of age and became chairman of Brøndby; his first action was to sack head coach Sinding. In his place, Brøndby hired former professional and Denmark national team player Finn Laudrup, who took over as head coach while he still took actively part in the matches as a player. Laudrup joined his brother-in-law Ebbe Skovdahl in the Brøndby team, and he brought his two young sons Brian and Michael Laudrup with him to the club. Under Finn Laudrup's influence, the club's playing style was changed to a more attacking strategy, even though Laudrup decided to fully concentrate his efforts as a player after only a year. After winning promotion in 1974, Laudrup left Brøndby in the 3rd Division in 1976 to play for KB in the Danish top-flight league (then named the 1st Division) and a year later Michael Laudrup, the brightest talent in Danish football, followed.

Professional football (1977–1987)
In 1977, Brøndby moved up into the 2nd Division, and were one of the clubs who quickly adapted to the new times of paid football in the best Danish leagues in 1978. Per Bjerregaard persuaded Finn Laudrup into returning to Brøndby in 1981 on a professional contract, and following a season of 85 goals in 30 matches, Brøndby won promotion to the top-flight 1st Division under coach Tom Køhlert. Finn Laudrup subsequently ended his career at age 36, but in his place Michael Laudrup returned for the 1982 season, being one of ten players leaving KB that year.

Brøndby won their 1st Division debut match 7–1 over fellow promoted team B 1909 in a match which featured two goals from Michael Laudrup. He was subsequently called up for the Denmark national team, and on 15 June 1982 he became the first Brøndby player to win a cap for the national team. Brøndby finished their first 1st Division season in fourth place with Laudrup the league's third top goal scorer with 15 goals, earning him the Danish Player of the Year award. In 1983, Laudrup was sold to Juventus in the then-biggest transfer deal in Denmark, giving Brøndby the economic foundation to expand further.

After four years in the top division, Brøndby won their first Danish championship in 1985 and played its first European match when the club beat Hungarian champions Budapest Honvéd 4–1 in the 1986 European Cup. In 1986, Brøndby became the first Danish club of fully professionals when ten players were signed full-time, and the club was introduced at the Copenhagen Stock Exchange in 1987.

European success (1987–1992)
Throughout the second half of the 1980s, the team dominated the league and did not finish lower than second place until 1992. The team was built around talented Danish players, and from 1987 to 1991 players from Brøndby won the Danish Player of the Year award every year. The recipients formed the backbone of the Denmark national team which later won UEFA Euro 1992, and was the first goalscorer in the 2–0 Euro 1992 final win John "Faxe" Jensen (1987), national team captain Lars Olsen (1988), the World's Best Goalkeeper 1992 and 1993 award winner Peter Schmeichel (1989), four-time Danish Player of the Year award winner Brian Laudrup (1990) and the second goalscorer of the Euro 1992 final Kim Vilfort (1991). The club became used to winning the national title and turned its attention towards European success.

In 1990, Brøndby hired former national team captain Morten Olsen as coach, and under his reign, the 1990–91 UEFA Cup became the high point in the short history of the club. Especially the meriting wins over German sides Eintracht Frankfurt and Bayer Leverkusen, and Russian club Torpedo Moscow saw the many Danish profiles shine, and the club was minutes from qualifying for the final match of the tournament. In the 88th minute of the semi-final, however, a Rudi Völler goal denied Brøndby a trip to the UEFA Cup final in favour of Roma. Following the impressive European display by the comparatively small club, important members of the team, including Lars Olsen, top scoring striker Bent "Turbo" Christensen and star goalkeeper Peter Schmeichel, left the club.

The following year, 1992, was the worst year in the club's history as the intended takeover of the Danish bank Interbank went awry. It was expected that European Cup success would boost the Brøndby stock value in order to finance the buy, but as the club was beaten by Dynamo Kyiv in the 1991–92 European Cup qualification, the stocks never reached the value necessary to finalize the deal. It had been arranged for financial backers Hafnia Insurance Company to step in and take over the buy in case Brøndby could not finance it, but as Hafnia went bankrupt, Brøndby were forced to buy Interbank and financial collapse was imminent as club debts amassed to 400 million DKK. A long-term rescue plan was initiated to save the club, but these events influenced the performance of the team and the championship, now called the Danish Superliga, was not won again until 1996.

Rebuilding (1992–2002)
The rebuilding of the team was led by head coach Ebbe Skovdahl, who deployed the team in a 4-4-2 formation. The return to the club of Euro 1992 veterans John Jensen and captain Lars Olsen combined with the emergence of goalkeeper Mogens Krogh and striker Ebbe Sand got the club back on its feet. The rebuilding culminated in the 1995–96 UEFA Cup elimination of Liverpool, though Roma once again knocked Brøndby out. Including that year, Brøndby won three Danish championships in a row, and the next year's UEFA Cup saw one of the biggest upsets in Brøndby history, as a 3–1 home defeat to Karlsruher SC was changed to an aggregate win when Brøndby beat the team of Euro 1996 winner Thomas Häßler 5–0 away in Germany. Most importantly for the club's economy, Brøndby qualified for the new format of the European Cup, rebranded as the UEFA Champions League.

The Champions League qualification meant six guaranteed matches in a group stage with three of the biggest teams of Europe, and when they were paired with Barcelona and later finalists Manchester United and Bayern Munich, Brøndby faced very economically attractive matches. Despite winning 2–1 over Bayern in the first match of the group stage, Brøndby conceded 18 goals in 6 matches and were eliminated with a single win to their name.

Skovdahl decided to take a stab at coaching at Scottish club Aberdeen and Brøndby took a more Scandinavian approach, in search of stable success in the European competitions with Norwegian club Rosenborg the role model. The club hired Norwegian manager Åge Hareide in 2000, who proclaimed a shift in line-up to a more attacking 4–3–3 system. With Hareide came a handful of Scandinavian players of whom especially Sweden national team player Mattias Jonson became a fan favourite.

The year 2000 was also the year the club finalized a planned expansion of Brøndby Stadion from a 20,000 to a 29,000 capacity, making it the second largest stadium in Denmark, only trailing the Parken Stadium of F.C. Copenhagen. At the cost of 250 million DKK, the vast expenditure was seen as a sign that the club was out of its former financial crisis. The building project was finalized in Autumn 2000, and on 22 October, 28,416 spectators saw Brøndby beat Akademisk Boldklub 4–2 in the opening match of the rebuilt stadium.

Hareide's visions of a 4–3–3 system never worked out, and the team soon returned to the well-known 4–4–2 setup. As he slowly lost hold of a ten-point lead to rivals F.C. Copenhagen, gained in a great first half of the 2001–02 Superliga season, Hareide took his leave in spring 2002 before the last matches of the season. He was replaced by youth team coach Tom Køhlert, who, though reluctant to take the job, gave first team debuts to the top youth team players, most notably Thomas Kahlenberg, who helped the club narrowly secure the championship win on goal difference.

The Laudrup years (2002–2006)
In the 2002–03 pre-season, Brøndby announced that Danish icon Michael Laudrup was taking the manager seat in his old club with John Jensen, also a club legend, as his assistant. In their first season, there were massive cuts from the very large squad; ten players were put in the reserves squad or sold and a talent squad was established. The club was to rely even more home grown players as Brøndby was already famous for developing very talented players. In the process, Laudrup told several players to find new clubs as he thought they would not fit in the playing style he wanted to implement.

During the Laudrup era, Brøndby won the Double in 2005. The club was relatively successful in the European competitions as Schalke 04 was beaten 2–1 in the 2003–04 UEFA Cup but was later beaten by Laudrup's former club Barcelona, 0–1.

In May 2006, it was announced that Laudrup and Jensen could not agree with the board of Brøndby regarding an extension of their contracts, and the duo left the club.

Years of crisis (2006–2013)
The two were replaced by Dutch coach René Meulensteen, who had a rough start in charge of the first team. Together with newly appointed Anders Bjerregaard – son of director Per Bjerregaard – Meulensteen bought a number of questionable players in the final days of the summer transfer window. In the first matches, the new coach struggled with injuries among the key players and the team had problems living up to the expectations.

Meulensteen resigned after six months, leaving Brøndby in seventh position halfway through the 2006–07 Superliga. The official explanation for his departure was that his family could not settle in Denmark, but soon after, the former coach revealed major infrastructural problems in the club's organization, calling the club "a very sick patient requiring immediate attention", as well as cliques inside the first team. In order to solve the clique problems, he had gone to director Per Bjerregaard to fire three key players – Marcus Lantz, Thomas Rytter and one club man Per Nielsen – in order to reestablish the balance in the first team squad, a demand Danish football experts later described as the quickest way of getting sacked.

Tom Køhlert took the managerial reins once more, this time as a permanent solution on a two-and-a-half-year contract.

After losing 2–4 to Horsens on 26 August, their 23rd consecutive away match without a victory, the team was met by approximately 200 furious fans and cries like "die mercenaries" and "we are Brøndby, who are you?" on their return to Brøndby.

On 31 August 2007, Per Bjerregaard announced that he resigned from the position as director of Brøndby IF, and instead took over as chairman of the board. Shortly after his resignation, Peter Schmeichel announced that he was ready to purchase Brøndby and become a director. The announcement divided the fans. Some praised the former player for trying to save the club, while others criticized him for bringing investor Aldo Petersen along, a keen supporter and former stockholder of rivals F.C. Copenhagen. Schmeichel's offer, however, was rejected. On 1 April 2008, Hermann Haraldsson was appointed to the vacant position.

Following a disappointing beginning of the 2007–08 Superliga season with only five points gained from seven matches, manager Tom Køhlert made it clear in August 2007 that the Danish Cup now had a higher priority for the club. The change of priorities was successful, and Brøndby won their first domestic title in almost three years on 1 May 2008 when Esbjerg were defeated 3–2 in the final of the 2007–08 Danish Cup. Soon after, manager Køhlert declared his job complete, prompting club chairman Bjerregaard to search for his replacement. On 16 June 2008, the club announced the appointment of former player and head coach of Horsens, Kent Nielsen. Nielsen took charge of the first team on 1 January 2009. Former legendary coach Køhlert in the meantime led Brøndby to the first place, where they stayed until Nielsen arrived.

On 1 July 2008, KasiGroup replaced Codan as the main sponsor of the club. The partnership involved a cooperation with UNICEF, making Brøndby the third club in Europe next to Barcelona and Swedish side Hammarby to wear the UNICEF logo on their shirts. Furthermore, KasiGroup entered a sponsorship for the stadium and promised substantial funds for strengthening the first-team squad. During the 2008 summer transfer window, this contributed to Brøndby signing five new players with national team experience in order to strengthen the team.

On 30 December 2009, KasiGroup owner Jesper Nielsen got in trouble with Brøndby and refused to pay the remainder of the pledged money. On 31 August 2012, Brøndby told the Danish media B.T. that KasiGroup owed the club more than DKK 45 million (€6,000,000 / £5,000,000). Nielsen told B.T. that he could recognize the amount but that his lawyer thought they could make a settlement at a much lower figure than the 45 million. Nielsen was the owner of AG København, which went bankrupt on 31 July 2012. He was thus chased both by Brøndby and the Danish tax authorities, and a lawsuit followed. The case came to a close years later, in 2018, when Brøndby IF and Nielsen reached a multi-million Danish kroner settlement depending on Nielsen's active arbitration case against jewellery manufacturer Pandora.

The Jan Bech era

Thomas Frank and "Oscar-gate" (2013–2016)

In May 2013, the club was again close to bankruptcy, but was taken over and saved by a small group of investors led by Ole Abildgaard and Aldo Pedersen. On 10 April 2014, the new main investor, Jan Bech Andersen, took over as chairman and replaced the board with his own team. On 14 July 2014, the club announced they had signed a one-year contract with Danish betting company Bet25 as their main sponsor, with the option to extend the contract for an additional two years. The deal was said to be worth "a significant amount in the million Danish kroner range". The deal includes a strategic partnership between Brøndby and Bet25. As part of the contract, Danish telecommunications company TDC A/S (which owns 51% of Bet25), installed Wi-Fi in Brøndby Stadion in December 2014. On 15 January 2015, it was announced Brøndby and Bet25 extended their contract until summer 2017.

In 2016, Thomas Frank announced his resignation as Brøndby IF manager after chairman Jan Bech Andersen had discredited him on an online chat-forum under the name of "Oscar", the case being referred to as "Oscar-gate" by the media. Bech Andersen stepped down as chairman after the incident but continued as board member.

Zorniger and the German years (2016–2019)
In April 2016, the board of directors presented Strategi 6.4 (Strategy 6.4), a plan for the future course of the club. The main value presented was "community", and a vision for Brøndby IF was also laid out. Between 2016 and 2019, the club was to make the Superliga championship playoff every year, become more transparent and reach economic viability by the end of the period. Finally, between 2020 and 2023, Brøndby was to reach European football every season and continue to improve in areas of community, transparency and economy. In addition, the team should strive for a tactic with strong pressing and return to having one of the best youth academies in Denmark again.

On 17 May 2016, Brøndby named German coach Alexander Zorniger as their new head coach. His first two seasons as head coach resulted in two second-place league finishes and a Danish Cup win. The focal point of Brøndby under Zorniger was an extreme form of the German Gegenpressing tactic, popularly translated to overfaldsfodbold (assault football) in Denmark; a style which proved to be a success. During the 2017–18 season, Brøndby mounted an eventful title charge to eventually finish second behind FC Midtjylland after being top of the table in the penultimate round. Zorniger was sacked in February 2019, following a poor start to the new campaign. His position had earlier been called into question after a match against Hobro IK in December 2018, where Brøndby's starting lineup featured no Danes. After the match, Zorniger criticised the Brøndby youth department for lacking quality and the Danish mentality for being poor. Martin Retov and Matthias Jaissle, former assistants under Zorniger, were appointed as caretaker managers the next day.

Frederiksen, "CV" and Superliga Champions (2019–2022)
In June 2019, former Denmark national U21 coach, Niels Frederiksen, was presented as the new head coach of Brøndby IF. A month later, Carsten "CV" Jensen was appointed as Director of Football in Brøndby, and became the person responsible for meeting the requirements of implementing Strategi 6.4. In Frederiksen's first season, Brøndby ended in fourth place of the league table, as the team failed to reach qualification to the Europa League. However, the team was largely seen to be in a rebuilding phase, with the departures of important first-team player such as Kamil Wilczek, Dominik Kaiser and Hany Mukhtar in the January transfer window, and the emergence of younger players such as Morten Frendrup, Jesper Lindstrøm and Anis Ben Slimane in the starting lineup.

On 24 May 2021, Brøndby won its first Danish league title in 16 years with a 2–0 win over Nordsjælland. Brøndby finished the season ahead of Midtjylland and arch-rival FC Copenhagen.

2022–present: Global Football Holdings takeover
On 28 August 2022, Jan Bech Andersen, chairman and main shareholder of the club, sold the majority of his shares to American company Global Football Holdings (GFH), spearheaded by Scott McLachlan. This meant that GFH would become the new majority shareholder of Brøndby with an ownership of just over 50% of the shares. Andersen continued as chairman of the board. GFH together with Andersen announced their intent of adding up to €30 million aimed at investments in support of Strategy 6.4. On 14 November, Frederiksen was dismissed from his position after Brøndby ended 2022 in 10th place in the league table after a poor run of form.

Stadium

Brøndby have always played their matches at Brøndby Stadion. A part of the merging of Brøndbyvester IF and Brøndbyøster IF was a promise by the Brøndby municipality mayor to build a ground, and in 1965 it was ready for the club to play in. Through the first years in the secondary Danish leagues, the stadium was little more than a grass field with an athletics track circling the field of play. It was not until 1978 that the main stand was built, sporting a capacity of 1,200 seated spectators. As newly promoted to the top Danish league in 1982, concrete terraces opposite the main stand were constructed, allowing for a crowd of 5,000 additional people. Following the first years of success in the top-flight, the athletic track was discarded and a further 2,000 seats were installed on top of the concrete stands from 1989 to 1990.

When Brøndby played matches against other successful European teams in the 1990–91 UEFA Cup, the then capacity of up to 10,000 spectators was quickly dwarfed by the ticket interest. As the Denmark national stadium Idrætsparken in Copenhagen was being rebuilt, the club found no other way to host the matches but to get a dispensation to use scaffolding stands, which boosted the stadium capacity to 18,000 in the semi-final leg of the tournament, a 0–0 draw with Roma. Following the European adventure, the club inaugurated its end stands in 1992, allowing for a total of 22,000 spectators.

In May 1998, the club bought Brøndby Stadion from the Brøndby municipality for 23.5 million DKK and immediately spent double that amount to modernize the stadium. When the club qualified for the 1998–99 UEFA Champions League, the stadium was still under construction and the matches were moved to archrival F.C. Copenhagen's Parken Stadium. In 2000, all stands were standardized and built to the same height, allowing for crowds of 29,000 at domestic matches and 22,000 in the European matches, which allow only all-seated crowds. Since then, the stadium has seen a number of lesser or larger infrastructural and technical enhancements, and the February 2004 European match against Barcelona was played in front of a 26,031-spectator crowd.

Support
Brøndby are the most widely popular football club in Denmark, with a 2015 study having showed that Brøndby matches have by far the most viewers, both in terms of attendance and TV ratings, with Brøndby's rivals FC Copenhagen coming in second. Copenhagen have in recent years surpassed Brøndby in terms of attendance by several thousands.

Brøndby Support is the official fanclub of Brøndby IF. It was founded in 1993 and has approximately 12,000 members.

Brøndby is also renowned for its ultra fanscene. The most prominent group is Alpha. Founded in 2006, the group is placed in the centre of the Southside Stand and are the main organizers of songs, flags, banners and tifo. Other prominent groups are Svinget, Deling 43 and Fri Sport.

Honours
 Danish Football Championship
 Winners (11): 1985, 1987, 1988, 1990, 1991, 1995–96, 1996–97, 1997–98, 2001–02, 2004–05, 2020–21
 Runner-up (11): 1986, 1989, 1994–95, 1998–99, 1999–2000, 2000–01, 2002–03, 2003–04, 2005–06, 2016–17, 2017–18
 Danish Cup
 Winners (7): 1988–89, 1993–94, 1997–98, 2002–03, 2004–05, 2007–08, 2017–18
 Runner-up (4): 1987–88, 1995–96, 2016–17, 2018–19
 Danish League Cup
 Winners (3): 1984, 2005, 2006
 Danish Super Cup
 Winners (4): 1994, 1996, 1997, 2002
 Royal League (3 participations)
 Winners: 2006–07
 Denmark Series (fourth tier)
 Group winners: 1974 (g1)
 Zealand Series (fifth tier)
 Winners: 1971

Players
See also Brøndby IF players
More than 300 players have represented Brøndby in the Danish leagues, cups and the European competitions since 1964.

Current squad

Youth players in use

Out on loan

Player of the year
Starting from 1980, the club has annually named its player of the year. Players still playing for the club are marked in bold:

 1980:  Brian Chrøis
 1981:  Ole Østergaard
 1982:  Michael Laudrup
 1983:  John Widell
 1984:  Bjarne Jensen
 1985:  Claus Nielsen
 1986:  Ole Madsen
 1987:  Lars Olsen
 1988:  Bjarne Jensen (2)
 1989:  Henrik Jensen
 1990:  Peter Schmeichel
 1991:  Kim Vilfort
 1992:  Uche Okechukwu
 1993:  Jes Høgh
 1994:  Ole Bjur
 1995:  Allan Nielsen
 1996:  Søren Colding
 1997:  Ebbe Sand
 1998:  Kim Daugaard
 1999:  Mogens Krogh
 2000:  Dan Anton Johansen
 2001:  Krister Nordin
 2002:  Aurelijus Skarbalius
 2003:  Per Nielsen
 2004:  Martin Retov
 2005:  Johan Elmander
 2006:  Per Nielsen (2)
 2007:  Mark Howard
 2008:  Thomas Rasmussen
 2009:  Stephan Andersen
 2010:  Michael Krohn-Dehli
 2011:  Michael Krohn-Dehli (2)
 2012:  Mike Jensen
 2013:  Simon Makienok
 2014:  Lukáš Hrádecký
 2015:  Riza Durmisi
 2016:  Frederik Rønnow
 2017:  Christian Nørgaard
 2018:  Kamil Wilczek
 2019:  Kamil Wilczek (2)
 2020: Andreas Maxsø
 2021:  Mikael Uhre
 2022:  Mads Hermansen

Wall of Honour
Since Michael Laudrup became the first player to represent Brøndby on the Denmark national team in June 1982, more than 80 players have donned the national team jersey of their respective countries. Apart from Denmark, players from Nigeria, Norway, Lithuania, Burkina Faso, Sweden, Faroe Islands, Morocco, Iceland, Zambia, Australia, Gambia, United States, Finland, North Macedonia, South Africa, Costa Rica, Poland, Hungary, Czech Republic, Kosovo, South Korea, Tunisia and Paraguay have represented their countries. The players are displayed on the "Wall of Honour", according to their year of national team debut. Players still playing for the club are marked in bold:

1980s
 Michael Laudrup (1982)
 Ole Madsen (1983)
 Brian Chrøis (1983)
 Ole Østergaard (1983)
 Lars Lunde (1983)
 Kim Christofte (1984)
 John Helt (1985)
 Lars Olsen (1986)
 John "Faxe" Jensen (1986)
 Claus Nielsen (1986)
 Kim Vilfort (1987)
 Per Steffensen (1987)
 Brian Laudrup (1987)
 Kent Nielsen (1987)
 Peter Schmeichel (1987)
 Bjarne Jensen (1988)
 Jan Bartram (1988)
 Bent "Turbo" Christensen (1989)
 Per Frimann (1989)

1990s
 Erik Rasmussen (1990)
 Uche Okechukwu (1990)
 Friday Elahor (1990)
 Brian Jensen (1991)
 Frank Pingel (1991)
 Mogens Krogh (1992)
 Marc Rieper (1992)
 Mark Strudal (1993)
 Jes Høgh (1993)
 Dan Eggen (1993)
 Jesper Kristensen (1994)
 Jens Risager (1994)
 Bo Hansen (1995)
 Allan Nielsen (1995)
 Peter Møller (1996)
 Ole Bjur (1996)
 Søren Colding (1996)
 Aurelijus Skarbalius (1996)
 Ebbe Sand (1998)
 Oumar Barro (1999)

2000s
 Magnus Svensson (2000)
 Mattias Jonson (2000)
 Peter Madsen (2001)
 Mads Jørgensen (2001)
 Morten Wieghorst (2002)
 Per Nielsen (2002)
 Jón Rói Jacobsen (2003)
 Thomas Kahlenberg (2003)
 Andreas Jakobsson (2003)
 Karim Zaza (2004)
 Asbjørn Sennels (2004)
 Martin Retov (2004)
 Morten Skoubo (2004)
 Johan Elmander (2004)
 Daniel Agger (2005)
 Hannes Sigurðsson (2006)
 Martin Ericsson (2006)
 Chris Katongo (2007)
 Stefán Gíslason (2007)
 Samuel Holmén (2008)
 Thomas Rasmussen (2008)
 Anders Randrup (2008)
 David Williams (2008)
 Max von Schlebrügge (2008)
 Stephan Andersen (2008)
 Ousman Jallow (2008)
 Michael Krohn-Dehli (2008)
 Morten "Duncan" Rasmussen (2008)
 Mikael Nilsson (2009)
 Martin Bernburg (2009)

2010s
 Mike Jensen (2010)
 Daniel Wass (2011)
 Brent McGrath (2011)
 Clarence Goodson (2011)
 Dennis Rommedahl (2011)
 René Joensen (2012)
 Simon Makienok (2013)
 Lukáš Hrádecký (2013)
 Ferhan Hasani (2014)
 José Ariel Núñez (2014)
 Teemu Pukki (2014)
 Hólmbert Friðjónsson (2015)
 Lebogang Phiri (2015)
 Riza Durmisi (2015)
 Frederik Rønnow (2016)
 Marco Ureña (2016)
 Kamil Wilczek (2016)
 Yun Suk-young (2017)
 Paulus Arajuuri (2017)
 Zsolt Kalmár (2017)
 Jan Kliment (2017)
 Besar Halimi (2017)
 Hjörtur Hermannsson (2017)
 Johan Larsson (2018)
 Simon Tibbling (2019)

2020s
 Simon Hedlund (2020)
 Anis Ben Slimane (2020)
 Blás Riveros (2020)
Jesper Lindstrøm (2020)
Andreas Maxsø(2020)
 Mikael Uhre (2021)
 Joe Bell (2022)
 Ohikhuaeme Omoijuanfo (2022)

Coaching staff

First team

Senior management

Updated 23 September 2019

Managerial history 
The person responsible for direction of the first senior team has traditionally been given the title of head coach/trainer.

Records
 Home victory, Danish Superliga: 7–0 vs. Herfølge, 11 July 2005
 Away victory, Danish Superliga: 7–0 vs. Esbjerg, 26 August 2001; 7–0 vs. AGF, 21 August 2016
 Home loss, Danish Superliga: 1–6 vs. Esbjerg, 14 March 2004
 Away Loss, Danish Superliga: 0–5 vs. Midtjylland, 29 July 2007
 Biggest win, European match 9–0 vs. Juvenes/Dogana, 2 July 2015
 Biggest Loss, European match 0–5 vs. PAOK, 20 August 2015; 0–5 vs. Manchester United, 4 November 1998
 Highest attendance, Brøndby Stadion: 31,508 vs. Copenhagen, 18 June 2003
 Highest average home attendance, season: 18,204, 2004–05
 Most appearances, European matches: 70, Per Nielsen
 Most appearances, total: 556, Bjarne Jensen
 Most goals scored, season, Danish Superliga: 28, Ebbe Sand 1997–98
 Most goals scored, Danish Superliga: 71, Kamil Wilczek
 Most goals scored, European matches: 12, Ruben Bagger
 Most goals scored, total: 121, Kim Vilfort

Recent history
{|class="wikitable"
|- style="background:#efefef;"
! Season
!
! Pos.
! Pl.
! W
! D
! L
! GS
! GA
! P
!Cup
!Europe
|-
|1995–96
|SL
|  style="text-align:right; background:gold;"|1
|align=right|33||align=right|20||align=right|7||align=right|6
|align=right|71||align=right|32||align=right|67
||Runner-Up
|Third Round UEFA Cup
|-
|1996–97
|SL
|  style="text-align:right; background:gold;"|1
|align=right|33||align=right|20||align=right|8||align=right|5
|align=right|57||align=right|38||align=right|68
||Semi-Finals
|Quarter-Finals UEFA Cup
|-
|1997–98
|SL
|  style="text-align:right; background:gold;"|1
|align=right|33||align=right|24||align=right|4||align=right|5
|align=right|81||align=right|33||align=right|76
||Winners
|First Round UEFA Cup
|-
|1998–99
|SL
|  style="text-align:right; background:silver;"|2
|align=right|33||align=right|19||align=right|4||align=right|10
|align=right|73||align=right|37||align=right|61
||Semi-Finals
|Group Stage UEFA Champions League
|-
|1999–00
|SL
|  style="text-align:right; background:silver;"|2
|align=right|33||align=right|15||align=right|9||align=right|9
|align=right|56||align=right|37||align=right|54
||Semi-Finals
|Third Qualifying Round UEFA Champions League/First Round UEFA Cup
|-
|2000–01
|SL
|  style="text-align:right; background:silver;"|2
|align=right|33||align=right|17||align=right|7||align=right|9
|align=right|71||align=right|42||align=right|58
||Quarter-Finals
|First Round UEFA Cup
|-
|2001–02
|SL
|  style="text-align:right; background:gold;"|1
|align=right|33||align=right|20||align=right|9||align=right|4
|align=right|74||align=right|28||align=right|58
||5th Round
|Third Round UEFA Cup
|-
|2002–03
|SL
|  style="text-align:right; background:silver;"|2
|align=right|33||align=right|17||align=right|11||align=right|7
|align=right|51||align=right|32||align=right|56
||Winners
|First Round UEFA Cup
|-
|2003–04
|SL
|  style="text-align:right; background:silver;"|2
|align=right|33||align=right|20||align=right|7||align=right|6
|align=right|55||align=right|29||align=right|67
||Semi-Finals
|Third Round UEFA Cup
|-
|2004–05
|SL
|  style="text-align:right; background:gold;"|1
|align=right|33||align=right|20||align=right|9||align=right|4
|align=right|61||align=right|23||align=right|69
||Winners
|Second Qualifying Round UEFA Cup
|-
|2005–06
|SL
|  style="text-align:right; background:silver;"|2
|align=right|33||align=right|21||align=right|4||align=right|8
|align=right|60||align=right|32||align=right|67
||Semi-Finals
|Third Qualifying Round UEFA Champions League/Group Stage UEFA Cup
|-
|2006–07
|SL
|  style="text-align:right; background:;"|6
|align=right|33||align=right|13||align=right|10||align=right|10
|align=right|50||align=right|38||align=right|49
||Fourth Round
|First Round UEFA Cup
|-
|2007–08
|SL
|  style="text-align:right; background:;"|8
|align=right|33||align=right|11||align=right|10||align=right|12
|align=right|44||align=right|44||align=right|43
||Winners
|First Round UEFA Cup
|-
|2008–09
|SL
|  style="text-align:right; background:#c96;"|3
|align=right|33||align=right|21||align=right|5||align=right|7
|align=right|55||align=right|31||align=right|68
||Semi-Finals
|First Round UEFA Cup
|-
|2009–10
|SL
|  style="text-align:right; background:#c96;"|3
|align=right|33||align=right|15||align=right|7||align=right|11
|align=right|57||align=right|50||align=right|52
||Fourth Round
|Playoff Round UEFA Europa League
|-
|2010–11
|SL
|  style="text-align:right; background:#c96;"|3
|align=right|33||align=right|9||align=right|9||align=right|15
|align=right|35||align=right|46||align=right|36
||Third Round
|Playoff Round UEFA Europa League
|-
|2011–12
|SL
|  style="text-align:right; background:;"|9
|align=right|33||align=right|13||align=right|12||align=right|8
|align=right|52||align=right|39||align=right|51
||Fourth Round
|Third Qualifying Round UEFA Europa League
|-
|2012–13
|SL
|  style="text-align:right; background:;"|9
|align=right|33||align=right|9||align=right|12||align=right|12
|align=right|39||align=right|45||align=right|39
||Semi-Finals
|
|-
|2013–14
|SL
|  style="text-align:right; background:;"|4
|align=right|33||align=right|13||align=right|13||align=right|7
|align=right|47||align=right|38||align=right|52
||Second Round
|Third Qualifying Round Europa League
|-
|2014–15
|SL
|  style="text-align:right; background:#c96;"|3
|align=right|33||align=right|16||align=right|7||align=right|10
|align=right|43||align=right|29||align=right|55
||Quarter-Finals
|Playoff Round Europa League
|-
|2015–16
|SL
|  style="text-align:right; background:;"|4
|align=right|33||align=right|16||align=right|6||align=right|11
|align=right|43||align=right|37||align=right|54
||Semi-Finals
|Playoff Round Europa League
|-
|2016–17
|SL
|  style="text-align:right; background:silver;"|2
|align=right|36||align=right|18||align=right|8||align=right|10
|align=right|62||align=right|40||align=right|62
||Runner-Up
|Second Qualifying Round Europa League
|-
|2017–18
|SL
|  style="text-align:right; background:silver;"|2
|align=right|36||align=right|24||align=right|9||align=right|3
|align=right|82||align=right|37||align=right|81
||Winners
|Third Qualifying Round Europa League
|-
|2018–19
|SL
|  style="text-align:right; background:;"|4
|align=right|36||align=right|15||align=right|7||align=right|14
|align=right|60||align=right|52||align=right|52
||Runner-Up
|Playoff Round Europa League
|-
|2019–20
|SL
|  style="text-align:right; background:;"|4
|align=right|36||align=right|16||align=right|8||align=right|12
|align=right|56||align=right|42||align=right|56
||Quarter-Finals
|Third Qualifying Round Europa League
|-
|2020–21
|SL
|  style="text-align:right; background:gold;"|1
|align=right|32||align=right|19||align=right|4||align=right|9
|align=right|58||align=right|38||align=right|61
||Fourth Round
|
|-
|2021–22
|SL
|  style="text-align:right; background:;"|4
|align=right|32||align=right|13||align=right|9||align=right|10
|align=right|40||align=right|41||align=right|48
||Quarter-Finals
|Europa League Group Stage
|}

Brøndby in European competitions

Brøndby's first competitive European match was on 17 September 1986 in the 1986–87 European Cup, defeating Budapest Honvéd 4–1 and later on Dynamo Berlin en route to a spot in the quarter-finals, where they lost to Porto. Since then, the club has been a regular fixture in European competitions, and reached the group stages of the UEFA Champions League and the UEFA Europa League several times. They also achieved one European semi-final in 1991, as well as another European quarter-final in 1997.

UEFA club coefficient ranking

Footnotes

A.  Danish club Aalborg BK played in the 1995–96 Champions League tournament as a result of the bribing scandal of Dynamo Kyiv, thus they did not qualify through the qualification rounds.

References

Bibliography

External links

 Official website 
 Brøndby IF at Superliga 
 Brøndby IF at UEFA 

 
Football clubs in Denmark
Association football clubs established in 1964
Brøndby Municipality
1964 establishments in Denmark
Football clubs in Copenhagen